The Bourne Supremacy: Original Motion Picture Soundtrack is the official soundtrack release to The Bourne Supremacy. It features selections of music by composer John Powell and Moby's "Extreme Ways", which was again featured over the film's closing credits as for The Bourne Identity, though the track was omitted from that film's soundtrack album release.  The song "Intothinair" by Mocean Worker is featured during the Moscow club scene, but does not appear on the film's official soundtrack.

Track listing 
 "Goa" – (3:00)
 "The Drop" – (3:42)
 "Funeral Pyre" – (2:21)
 "Gathering Data" – (1:54)
 "Nach Deutschland" – (2:40)
 "To the Roof" – (5:32)
 "New Memories" – (2:48)
 "Berlin Foot Chase" – (5:16)
 "Alexander Platz/Abbotts Confesses" – (3:34)
 "Moscow Wind Up" – (6:54)
 "Bim Bam Smash" – (5:09)
 "Atonement" – (1:30)
 "Extreme Ways" by Moby – (3:56)

Credits 
 Music Performed By - The Hollywood Studio Symphony
 Orchestra Conducted By - Pete Anthony
 Orchestrations By - Elizabeth Finch, Bruce Fowler, Walter Fowler, Rick Giovinazzo and Yvonne S. Moriarty
 Additional Music By - John Ashton Thomas
 Mixed By - Steve Kempster, Dennis S. Sands
 Edited By - Peter Myles

Instrumentation 
 Strings: 33 violins, 14 violas, 14 violoncellos, 10 double basses
 Woodwinds: 1 bassoon
 Brass: 6 French horns, 3 trumpets, 4 trombones
 Live Percussion: 4 players
 Drums: 3 players
 2 guitars, 1 piano

Awards 
Won an ASCAP Award and nominated for two World Soundtrack Awards.

References

2004 soundtrack albums
Jason Bourne
John Powell (film composer) soundtracks
Varèse Sarabande soundtracks
Action film soundtracks
2000s film soundtrack albums